Nandulehe Town is a town loctated on the eastern Pinggu District, Beijing, China. Situated on the banks of Ju River, It borders Xiong'erzhai and Huangsongyu Townships in the north, Jinhaihu Town in the east, Xujiatai Township in the south, as well as Xiagezhuang and Shandongzhuang Towns in the west . It had 18,847 people residing within its borders as of 2020.

History

Administrative divisions 
At the time of writing, Nandulehe Town is subdivided into the following 13 villages:

See also 

 List of township-level divisions of Beijing

References 

Pinggu District
Towns in Beijing